Paul Maxwell (born Maxim Popovich; November 12, 1921December 19, 1991) was a Canadian actor who worked mostly in British cinema and television, in which he was usually cast as American characters. In terms of audience, his most notable role was probably that of Steve Tanner, the ex-GI husband of Elsie Tanner in the soap opera Coronation Street in 1967.

Life and career
During World War II, Maxwell served in the Royal Canadian Artillery. He studied at Yale University, and graduated with a Master of Fine Arts.

Maxwell started as an actor in the U.S., appearing in series such as Dragnet and Alfred Hitchcock Presents before emigrating to Britain in 1960. In the next decade, Maxwell appeared in many TV series produced by ITC Entertainment, such as Danger Man and The Baron. He also voiced North American characters in series filmed by Gerry Anderson's production company Century 21, most prominently the leading character of Colonel Steve Zodiac in Fireball XL5 (1962) and the supporting character of Captain Grey in Captain Scarlet and the Mysterons (1967). Maxwell also made several appearances in UFO (1970).

Maxwell also starred as the "Man with the Panama Hat" in the film Indiana Jones and the Last Crusade (1989), as a C.I.A Director in The Pink Panther Strikes Again (1976), and as General Maxwell Taylor in A Bridge Too Far (1977). His real passion, however, was theatre; he starred in the West End several times, with roles in Twelve Angry Men and the musical Promises, Promises.

After the Second World War, Maxwell married Mary Lindsay. The couple had one daughter.

Selected filmography

 1957 Death in Snall Doctor as Doctor (uncredited)
 1957 Blood of Dracula as Mike, Young Doctor
 1958 The True Story of Lynn Stuart as Customer (uncredited)
 1958 How to Make a Monster as Jeffrey Clayton
 1958 Submarine Seahawk as Lieutenant Commander Bill Hallohan, XO
 1958-1959 Playhouse 90 as Cooley / Recorder
 1959 Never So Few as Co-Pilot (uncredited)
 1960 Bells Are Ringing as Party Guest (uncredited)
 1961 Freedom to Die as Craig Owen
 1961 Sea Hunt ("The Destroyers") as Dr. Neal Martin
 1962 We Joined the Navy as Commander Spelling, USN
 1963 Follow the Boys as C.M.A.A
 1963 Shadow of Fear as Bill Martin
 1963 The Haunting as Bud Fredericks (uncredited)
 1964 Man in the Middle as Major Fred Smith
 1965 Up from the Beach as Corporal Evans
 1965 City of Fear as Mike Foster
 1966 La cieca di Sorrento as Unknown
 1966 Thunderbirds Are GO as Captain Paul Travers
 1967 The 25th Hour as Photographer
 1967 It! as Jim Perkins
 1967 The Man Outside as Judson Murphy
 1967-1968 Captain Scarlet and the Mysterons as Captain Grey
 1970 The Looking Glass War as CIA Man
 1972 Madame Sin as Connors
 1972 Ooh... You Are Awful as 1st US Tourist (voice only)
 1973 Baxter! as Mr. Baxter
 1974 Percy's Progress as UN Delegate (uncredited)
 1976 The Pink Panther Strikes Again as CIA Director
 1976 Spy Story as Submarine Captain
 1977 A Bridge Too Far as Major General Maxwell Taylor
 1980 Cry Wolf as Dr. Jack Russell
 1983 Sahara as Chase
 1985 Rustlers' Rhapsody as Sheepherder #1
 1986 Aliens as Van Leuwen
 1986 Strong Medicine as Mace
 1989 Indiana Jones and the Last Crusade as Panama Hat

References

External links

1921 births
1991 deaths
20th-century Canadian male actors
Male actors from Winnipeg
Canadian expatriate male actors in the United Kingdom
Canadian expatriates in England
Canadian male film actors
Canadian male musical theatre actors
Canadian male soap opera actors
Canadian male stage actors
Canadian male television actors
Canadian male voice actors